The Waldshut–Koblenz Rhine Bridge is a single-track railway bridge on the Turgi–Koblenz–Waldshut railway, between Waldshut and Koblenz AG, crossing the Rhine and the border between Germany and Switzerland. It was the first railway bridge built over the Rhine below Lake Constance. It is the only major railway bridge over the Rhine, which is completely preserved in its original condition and is one of Europe's few lattice truss bridges. It is also one of the oldest railway bridges in the world.

The bridge carries passenger services of line S27 of the Aargau S-Bahn, operating between Baden and Waldshut, and line S41 of the Zurich S-Bahn, operating between Winterthur and Waldshut.

History
On 26 August 1857 the Grand Duchy of Baden State Railways signed an agreement with the Swiss Northeastern Railway to construct the cross-border Turgi–Koblenz–Waldshut railway, including the Rhine bridge. Thus on 18 August 1859, the line was commissioned as the first connection between the Baden Mainline and the Swiss railway network. The current main rail connection between Germany and Switzerland, the Basel Link Line, was opened 14 years later. The Baden architect Robert Gerwig designed the bridge and managed its construction. The steel superstructure was supplied and installed by the Gebrüder Benckiser company of Pforzheim. The bridge was designed for two tracks, but only one track was installed. Due to increasing traffic loads, the bridge was strengthened in 1912 and 1913, being reinforced to carry  axle loads and then the track was moved from the eastern side of the bridge to the middle. The demolition of the bridge planned by the German army on 24 April 1945 was not in fact carried out, so the technical landmark of the bridge in its original design is still preserved today.

A report of the University of Karlsruhe in 1974 estimated the bridge’s remaining useful life as 10 to 15 years, provided that new corrosion protection was applied; this was carried out in 1978. Ten years later Deutsche Bundesbahn closed the line, after Swiss Federal Railways (SBB), the owners of half the bridge, refused a request for an updated report on the bridge. Until the electrification of the Waldshut–Koblenz gap in 1999, passenger services on the bridge were carried out by diesel multiple units of Deutsche Bahn. From 1999, SBB took over management of services on the bridge using electric multiple units. In 2007, about 34 trains daily operated as line S41 of the Zürich S-Bahn between Waldshut and Winterthur.

In late 2011, the SBB introduced refurbished Class 560 electric multiple units to the S27 line. Unfortunately the refurbishment, which included the introduction of air conditioning, took the axle loading of a fully loaded power car over the maximum  for the bridge. Following work on the bridge, these restrictions were lifted in early 2014.

Construction

The greatly varying spans of the main bridge result from the nature of the currents in the Rhine.

The superstructure of the lattice truss bridge is made of wrought iron and is box shaped in cross-section. At has a continuous beam along its length. The diagonal struts are formed from flat steel and riveted together at the intersections. The vertical pillars consist of four riveted corners.

Assembly 
The superstructure of the current bridge was assembled in three sections on the Waldshut bank in a temporary work hall. After completion of the first segment, it was rolled out of the hall. Then the second segment was built, and on its completion was connected with the first. The actual installation of the bridge was carried with the support of piles in the Rhine, using of a  wooden launching nose, propelled over a runway. The launching of the superstructure was carried out using human-powered transport mechanisms.

See also
List of bridges over the Rhine

References

Bibliography

External links

Railway bridges in Germany
Railway bridges in Switzerland
Bridges over the Rhine
Bridges completed in 1859
Buildings and structures in Baden-Württemberg
Continuous truss bridges
Railway lines in Baden-Württemberg
Railway lines in Switzerland